Peterson Creek is a stream in San Mateo County, California and is a tributary of Pescadero Creek.

References

See also
List of watercourses in the San Francisco Bay Area

Rivers of San Mateo County, California
Rivers of Northern California
Tributaries of Pescadero Creek